Isaac Kiprono Songok (born 25 April 1984 in Kaptel, Nandi District) is a Kenyan long-distance runner.

He went St. Patrick's High School in Iten, famous for producing runners.

In 2001 he set a new 2000 m World Junior Record (4:56.86) in Berlin and became World Youth Champion at 1500 metres.

He is best known for winning the silver medal in the short race at the 2006 World Cross Country Championships.

He is managed by James Templeton and coached by Colm O'Connell. Songok is from Kaptel village, as is Bernard Lagat, another famous athlete.

Achievements

Personal bests
1500 metres - 3:30.99 min (2004)
Mile - 3:54.56 min (2001)
3000 metres - 7:28.72 min (2006)
5000 metres - 12:48.66 min (2006)

External links

IAAF, March 27, 2006: Focus on Africa - Isaac Kiprono Songok (KEN)

1984 births
Living people
Kenyan male middle-distance runners
Kenyan male long-distance runners
Athletes (track and field) at the 2004 Summer Olympics
Olympic athletes of Kenya
People from Nandi County
Kenyan male cross country runners